Otoyol 31, named the İzmir-Aydın Motorway or just the Aydın Motorway and abbreviated as the O-31 is a  long toll motorway in western Turkey. Beginning at an intersection with İzmir Beltway, the O-31 runs south from İzmir to Aydın and parallels the D550 for most of its route.

Plans to extend the O-31 further to Denizli and Burdur have been finalized and the tender is expected to be awarded on 18 September 2018.

Route Description

İzmir

The O-31 begins at Işıkkent interchange, a trumpet interchange with the İzmir Beltway (O-30) in southeast Buca, İzmir, outside the urban city zone. From there, the route heads south through the recently closed Işıkkent Toll Plaza until reaching the Lesser Menderes Plain. The motorway crosses over the D.550, which is accessible via Exit K1. Exit K1, named Havalimanı, also provides access to Adnan Menderes Airport, via the D.550. 

Following Exit K1 the O-31 becomes a toll motorway after passing through Pancar Toll Plaza, which uses automated vehicle classification to recognize different types of vehicles and price them accordingly. 

The next and first tolled exit on the motorway is Exit K2, named Torbalı, which is the Torbalı connector. Following Exit K2, the motorway continues south bypassing Torbalı on the west. Near the village of Sağlık, is the Sağlık Rest Area, which consist of restaurants and a gas station. Exit K3, named Belevi, is the last exit within the İzmir province. This exit connects to the D.550 to Selçuk as well as the coastal city of Kuşadası.

Aydın

After exiting the tunnel, the Selatin Rest Area is available for northbound drivers. The motorway descends into the Greater Menderes Plain and turns east. After passing over the Kızılcapınar viaducts, Exit K4, named Germencik, connects to the D.525 to Söke, as well as the D.550 to Germencik. Following the exit, the Germencik Rest Area is available to southbound drivers. After passing over the İkizdere Creek, the tolled section ends at the Aydın Toll Plaza. 

Right after the toll plaza is Exit K5, named Aydın North, with the D.550 in west Aydın. The O-31 becomes the Aydın Beltway and runs around the south of the city. The next exit is Exit K6 with the D.550, which heads south to Muğla. Up until 2016, this was the end of the motorway. Following Exit K6, is the incomplete Exit K7. Exit K7 is where the motorway will continue east to Denizli and Burdur, but for now the O-31 branches off its future route to Denizli and continues as the Aydın Beltway. The next exit, Exit K71, connects to Mehmet Ali Tosun Boulevard and the Aydın Airport. The route then curves north and ends at an intersection with the D.320 in east Aydın.

Exit list

See also
 List of highways in Turkey

References

External links

31
Transport in İzmir Province
Toll roads in Turkey